The Hulstlander is a small/medium breed of rabbit only recognised in white with pale blue eyes. Any other colour is a fault.

See also

List of rabbit breeds

References

Rabbit breeds